Boshrabad (also Romanized as Boshrābād) is a village in Fazl Rural District, in the Central District of Nishapur County, Razavi Khorasan Province, Iran. At the 2006 census, its population was 1,123, in 294 families.

References 

Populated places in Nishapur County